Milica Miljanov (c. 1860 – ?) was a Montenegrin soldier and war heroine in World War I.

Biography

Milica Miljanov was born in Medun, around 1860. She was one of three daughters of the Montenegrin duke, Marko Miljanov. She married Ivan Lazović. Miljanov volunteered to the army in 1914 as a mother and at an age when even men are relieved from active duty, fighting all across the Balkan warfront. Unlike other women who joined the army, she did not change her identity and name, and was able to fight as a woman till the end of the war. Her daughter, Olga, born in 1898, was a writer, dancer, composer, philosopher and teacher, who was remembered as Olgivanna Lloyd Wright, the wife and associate of the American architect, Frank Lloyd Wright.

Legacy
The role of women in World War I was reflected in the monodrama „Čelične ratnice - Žene dobrovoljci u Prvom svetskom ratu” ("Steel Warriors - Women's Volunteers in the First World War"), which was held in December 2014 at the Historical Museum of Serbia, in the accompanying program of the exhibition "Serbia 2014". This monodrama transmits the testimonies of women who, as warriors, volunteer nurses or humanitarian workers, took part in World War I. Among the numerous testimonies is the story of Miljanova. The text is based on original records, authentic statements, and passages from the biographies of women warriors of World War I.

References

Bibliography
 
 

1860 births
Year of death unknown
Military personnel from Podgorica
20th-century Montenegrin women
Montenegrin women in World War I